The Envoy is the fifth studio album by American singer-songwriter Warren Zevon. The album was released on July 16, 1982, by Asylum Records. The album's lack of commercial success caused Zevon's label to terminate his recording contract.

The title track was inspired by veteran American diplomat Philip Habib's shuttle diplomacy during Israel's Lebanon incursion of 1982.

Zevon later said of the album's lack of success, "I would start a record more or less as soon as I'd finished the one previous to it, and they took longer, cost more and more, and actually did sort of less and less well. Particularly The Envoy. I was a little discouraged after that.". All of that, despite the fact that "Let Nothing Come Between You", a love ballad written by Zevon, charted as high as 24 on the Mainstream Billboard Rock chart.

Track listing
All songs written by Warren Zevon except as indicated.

Personnel
 Warren Zevon – vocals, guitar on 1 and 7; piano on 1, 2, 5, 8, and 9; synthesizer on 1 and 5–8; electric piano on 3
 Waddy Wachtel – guitar on 1–5 and 7–9; percussion and harmony vocals on 5
 David Landau – guitar on 1, 2, 5, and 6; backing vocals on 6
 Leland Sklar – bass guitar on 1, 2, 3, and 5
 Jeff Porcaro – drums on 1–3, 5, and 8; log drums on 3; puili sticks on 3

 Additional personnel
 Don Henley – harmony vocals on 1
 Lindsey Buckingham – harmony vocals on 2
 Jim Horn – recorders on 3, saxophone
 Jordan Zevon – harmony vocals on 3
 Steve Lukather – guitar on 5
 Jorge Calderón – harmony vocals on 5
 Danny Kortchmar – guitar on 6
 LeRoy Marinell – guitar on 6
 Mike Botts – drums on 6
 Steve Forman – percussion on 6
 J.D. Souther – backing vocals on 6, harmony vocals on 8
 Bob Glaub – bass guitar on 7 and 9
 Rick Marotta – drums on 7
 Kenny Edwards – bass guitar on 8
 Graham Nash – harmony vocals on 8
 Russ Kunkel – drums on 9
Technical
 Jamie Ledner, Wayne Tadouye – engineers
 Jimmy Wachtel – design, cover photography

Charts

References

Warren Zevon albums
1982 albums
Albums produced by Greg Ladanyi
Albums produced by Waddy Wachtel
Asylum Records albums
Albums with cover art by Jimmy Wachtel